The Two O'Clock Lab Band is the second highest level of nine big bands (see One O'Clock Lab Band) of the Jazz Studies Division at the University of North Texas College of Music, a comprehensive music school with the largest enrollment of any music institution accredited by the National Association of Schools of Music, and oldest (and first) in the world offering a degree in jazz studies.

History
While the One O'Clock is the highest level of the nine Lab Bands; the Two O'Clock has, for several decades, held acclaim as a "destination band" at the University.  The Two O'Clock produces professionally engineered albums and, on concert tours, is well received.  The Band has a long list of successful alumni musicians who never played with the One O'Clock, some of whom are listed below.  "Making" the One O'Clock often is a matter of timing.  If, for example, several talented musicians are vying for a certain chair in the One O'Clock, and that chair is held by someone for two years, then a qualified student might likely complete his or her studies playing in another Lab Band.

Awards and honors
 1992, 1993, 1994, 2005, 2006 — Down Beat Magazine poll selected the UNT Two O'Clock Lab Band as "Winner" of the Annual Student Music Awards (James Riggs, director). The band has toured and performed at Walt Disney World.  National jazz radio programs, including Pandora, includes recordings from the Two O'Clock Lab Band as well as the One O'Clock.
 2005 — The Two O'Clock Lab Band was named Down Beat Magazine's best college band for 2005
 2010 — 33rd Downbeat Annual Student Music Awards: Large Jazz Ensemble, Graduate College Winner (Jay Saunders, Director)

Discography

Directed by Jim Riggs

 The Transparent Two (Oct 4, 1994) Seafair Bolo 
 Two O'Clock Jazz Band I (1997) Klavier KD 77019 
 A Salute to Benny Carter (1999) CD Klavier (K 77028) 
 Two O'Clock Jazz Band II (recorded May 1997, released March 1999) CD Klavier (K 77023) 
 The Translucent Two (2001) CD Klavier 
 The Manne We Love: Gershwin Revisited, with the Steve Houghton Quintet (2002) CD TNC Jazz 
 The Two O'Clock Jazz Band "Live"
 Avenue "C" Jazz, North Texas Jazz, 06032 JR (released 2009; but recorded by the 2005-06 band) 
 The Best of the Big O (2005) CD 
 Bruce Hall Jazz Music (2009) 
 Denton Texas Jazz Giant, North Texas Jazz, 07052 JR

Directed Jay Saunders

 Too Two (2009) CD 
 Under The Radar (2010) CD 
 Two Twos (2011-2012) 2 CDS
 Kind of Two (2013) CD

Directors
 Jim Riggs (retired 2008)
 Jay Saunders (fall 2008 to spring 2014. Also fall semester of 2005, when Jim Riggs was on sabbatical)
 Rodney Booth (fall 2014 to spring 2019)
 Rob Parton (fall 2019 to present)

Notable Two O'Clock Alumni (who never played in the One O'Clock)
 Kirk Covington
 Michael Daugherty
 Dennis Irwin (1951–2008)

See also
 One O'Clock Lab Band

References

External links 
Best of the Big O review by Jack Bowers, allaboutjazz.com
Bruce Hall Jazz Music review by Jack Bowers, allaboutjazz.com

American jazz ensembles from Texas
Big bands
Swing music
University of North Texas
Musical groups from Denton, Texas
Music
Jazz musicians from Texas